Voxna was a former community (1863–1951) in southern Hälsingland in Ovanåker Municipality in Sweden, along the Bollnäs central railway. The community was named for the Voxnan river to the North.

References 

Populated places in Ovanåker Municipality
Hälsingland